In 2020, 29.1% of the Australian resident population, or 7,502,000 people, were born overseas.

International comparison

Australia has one of the highest amounts of foreign-born residents in the world (both in total numbers, and per capita), as well as one of the highest immigration rates in the world.

Immigrants account for 30% of the population, the highest proportion among major Western nations.

In 2015, Australia had the 8th highest foreign-born population in the world, behind Canada but ahead of France (both countries had very close numbers to Australia). The United States was ranked 1st, with over 46 million foreign-born residents. The over 7 million immigrants in Australia constituted 3.1% of all immigrants in the world.

For foreign-born residents per capita, Australia was ranked the 11th highest sovereign country ahead of Lebanon and behind Jordan (both countries experienced a large influx of refugees from the civil war in neighbouring Syria). Vatican City was 1st, its population of 800 were 100% foreign-born. If dependent territories (e.g.: Guam, Macau, Channel Islands) were included, then Australia's rank would fall to 27th.

From 2010 to 2015, Australia had the 14th highest net migration rate in the world. For 2015–2020, Australia's migration rate was projected to fall (statistics published in 2019), however the country's rank was expected to remain steady at 14th due to similar falls in other countries.

Population by country of birth (2021)

The following table shows Australia's population by country of birth as estimated by the Australian Bureau of Statistics in 2021. It shows only countries or regions or birth with a population of over 100,000 residing in Australia.

Historical populations by country of birth

The following table shows Australia's population by country of birth during historical census years. Only countries with over 30,000 Australian residents are shown.

Foreign-born population by state/territory

As per the 2016 Census, while 6 out of every 10 migrants live in Victoria or New South Wales, there had been a noticeable increase in the number of migrants that settled down Western Australia and Queensland.

In 2016, among all the capital cities in Australia, Sydney – at 1,773,496 – had the highest overseas-born population. Melbourne, on the other hand, had 1,520,253 overseas-born individuals living in the city as per the 2016 Census. Perth, with 702,545 in 2016, came in at the third spot on the list of cities with the highest number of overseas-born population.2

According to the 2016 Census, among all the Australian states and territories, Western Australia had the largest population of overseas-born individuals.

See also

Visa policy of Australia
Demography of Australia
Department of Immigration and Border Protection
Post war immigration to Australia
Multiculturalism in Australia
Asylum in Australia

References

Sources
Commonwealth of Australia. Migration Act 1958

Further reading
 Betts, Katharine. Ideology and Immigration: Australia 1976 to 1987 (1997)
 Burnley, I.H. The Impact of Immigration in Australia: A Demographic Approach (2001)
 Foster, William, et al. Immigration and Australia: Myths and Realities (1998)
 Jupp, James. From White Australia to Woomera: The Story of Australian Immigration (2007)  excerpt and text search
 Jupp, James. The English in Australia (2004)  excerpt and text search
 Jupp, James. The Australian People: An Encyclopedia of the Nation, its People and their Origins (2002)
 Markus, Andrew, James Jupp and Peter McDonald, eds. Australia's Immigration Revolution (2010)  excerpt and text search
 O'Farrell, Patrick. The Irish in Australia: 1798 to the Present Day (3rd ed. Cork University Press, 2001)
 Wells, Andrew, and Theresa Martinez, eds. Australia's Diverse Peoples: A Reference Sourcebook (ABC-CLIO, 2004)

External links
Department of Immigration and Border Protection of Australia
Costello hope for skilled migrant intake
NSW training Chinese workers
Chinese Museum - Museum of Chinese immigration to Australia in Melbourne
Origins: Immigrant Communities in Victoria – Immigration Museum, Victoria, Australia
NSW Migration Heritage Centre, Australia
Office of The Migration Agents Registration Authority (OMARA)
Australian State of Queensland skilled and business migration information site
Australian State of Victoria official site for skilled and business migrants
Culture Victoria – Stories about migration to Australia
 Migration Alliance - Peak Society for Australian Migrants and Migration Agents (Not-for-profit incorporated association)
  (Immigration in Sydney) [CC-By-SA]